Hazro (Punjabi) is a town located at north-west of Pakistan in Hazro Tehsil of Attock District in Punjab Province of Pakistan. 

It is located approximately halfway between Peshawar and Islamabad, the federal capital. This town is the capital of Hazro Tehsil, an administrative subdivision of the district, and the central marketplace of the Chach Valley, consisting of 84 villages located along the Indus River.

2nd connectivity through M1 (Peshawar-Islamabad Motorway) is at Chach Interchange (چھچھ انٹرچینج), Which is the main entry to the town if coming from Islamabad or Peshawar.

History

Indo–Scythians

Liaka Kusulaka was an Indo-Scythian satrap of the area of Chukhsa (Chach) during the 1st century BCE.

Early Muslim Rule
According to the Gazetteer of Rawalpindi, Hazro was the battlefield of the Battle of Chach in which, in AD 1008, Ghaznavid Sultan Mahmud Ghaznavi defeated the united forces of the Hindu Shahi ruler Anandapala with a slaughter of 20,000 men.

British Raj
During British Rule the town of Hazro became part of Attock Tehsil; the municipality of Attock which was created in 1867 and the North-Western Railway connected the town to Lawrencepur. By the 20th century the town was surrounded by rich cultivation, and had a flourishing trade, chiefly in tobacco and sugar. The population according to the 1901 census of India was 9,799.

Notable people
Yasir Ali
Zubair Ali Zai

References

Cities and towns in Attock District